Wonderful Electric: Live in London is a video album by English electronic music duo Goldfrapp. It was released on DVD on 27 September 2004 by Mute Records. A four-track extended play was released digitally on the same day.

DVD track listing
Disc one: Live at Somerset House, 13 July 2003
 "Deep Honey"
 "Human"
 "Lovely Head"
 "Crystalline Green"
 "Train"
 "Utopia"
 "Tiptoe"
 "Deer Stop"
 "Twist"
 "Strict Machine"
 "Pilots"
 "Slippage"
 "Yes Sir"
 "Black Cherry"
 "Twisted Summer" (documentary)

Disc two: Live at Shepherd's Bush Empire, 4 December 2001
 "Paper Bag"
 "Human"
 "Deer Stop"
 "Lovely Head"
 "Pilots"
 "Little Death"
 "Felt Mountain"
 "Utopia"
 "U.K. Girls (Physical)"
 "Sartorius"
 "Horse Tears"
 "Trip to Felt Mountain" (documentary)

EP track listing
 "Strict Machine" (Live from Somerset House) – 4:37
 "Train" (Live from Somerset House) – 5:04
 "Tiptoe" (Live from Somerset House) – 5:15
 "Lovely Head" (Live from Shepherd's Bush Empire) – 3:57

Charts

References

2004 debut EPs
2004 live albums
2004 video albums
Goldfrapp albums
Goldfrapp video albums
Live EPs
Live video albums
Mute Records EPs
Mute Records video albums